The Ghent May Regatta, founded in 1889, is one of the largest rowing regattas in Belgium and the Netherlands.
It is organised by Royal Sport Nautique de Gand, and was one of the first foreign co-winners of the Grand Challenge Cup.
Eveline Peleman is a member of the club.

External links

 Rowing Belgium
 Ghent May regatta 2013 World Rowing
 Ghent May Regatta 2012 World Rowing
 Royal Sport Nautique de Gand website (Dutch)
 Rowing Belgium (French)
 Facebook page Rowing in Belgium 

1889 establishments in Belgium
Sports competitions in Ghent
History of rowing
Recurring events established in 1889
May events
Annual events in Belgium
Rowing competitions in Belgium
Spring (season) events in Belgium